Gawaki may refer to:

Gawaki, Badakhshan, Afghanistan
Gawaki, Faryab, Afghanistan